The Republic of San Marino maintains an extensive diplomatic network in relation to its diminutive size. San Marino maintains official relations with ten states at a resident ambassadorial level. Furthermore, San Marino maintains an extensive network of honorary consulates.

America

 New York City (Embassy)

Asia

 Jakarta (Embassy)

 Tokyo (Embassy)

Europe
  
 Tirana (Embassy)

 Vienna (Embassy)  

 Brussels (Embassy)

 Sarajevo (Embassy)

 Paris (Embassy)

 Rome (Embassy)

 Rome (Embassy)

 Madrid (Embassy)

Multilateral organisations
 Brussels (Mission to the European Union)
 Geneva (Delegation to the International Committee of the Red Cross and Mission to the UN bodies in Geneva)
 New York City (Mission to the United Nations)
 Paris (Mission to UNESCO)
 Strasbourg (Mission to the Council of Europe)

Gallery

See also
Foreign relations of San Marino
List of diplomatic missions in San Marino

Notes

References

San Marino
Foreign relations of San Marino
Diplomatic missions